The 22nd edition of the Vuelta Ciclista de Chile was held from March 11 to March 21, 1999.

Stages

1999-03-11: Santiago (Circuito "Avenue Merino Benítez") (4 km)

1999-03-12: Santiago — El Tabo (137.4 km)

1999-03-13: El Tabo — San Fernando (164.3 km)

1999-03-14: Curicó — Constitución (173.3 km)

1999-03-15: Cauquenes — San Pedro de la Paz (149.4 km)

1999-03-16: Concepción — Los Angeles (139.9 km)

1999-03-17: Los Angeles — Chillán (135 km)

1999-03-18: Chillán — Talca (158.4 km)

1999-03-19: Talca — Curicó (97.5 km)

1999-03-19: Cruce Curicó — El Plumero (20 km)

1999-03-20: Curicó — Isla de Maipo (200 km)

1999-03-21: Santiago (Circuito "Providencia") (71.4 km)

Final classification

References 
 cyclingnews

Vuelta Ciclista de Chile
Vuelta Ciclista
Chile
March 1999 sports events in South America